Archgoat is a Finnish black metal band formed in 1989 by twin brothers Ritual Butcherer on guitar and Lord Angelslayer on bass and vocals. It was one of Finland's first black metal bands along with Barathrum, Impaled Nazarene and Beherit. The members of Archgoat openly identify with the philosophy of Satanism and the occult as expressed in their lyrical content, which also consists of anti-Christian themes.

History 
Archgoat is seen as one of the most influential metal bands from Finland. Archgoat were formed in 1989 in Turku, Finland, though they did not release their first recording, titled Jesus Spawn, until 1991. Then in 1992, the band landed a record contract with Necropolis Records. In 1993, their MLP, Angelcunt (Tales of Desecration), was released. Later that year Archgoat entered into a full-time studio deal with Necropolis. However, after their recording sessions, a disagreement with terms of their contract resulted in the band refusing to release the finished material to the public.

In 1993, Archgoat began an extensive hiatus, citing their belief that they did not belong in a "commercial" black metal scene. The band did not reform until 2004, when they released their 1993 material as a 7-inch EP, titled Angelslaying Black Fucking Metal, through Hammer of Hate Records. Their show, First Live Black Mass, concert was recorded in Finland in 2005. Drummer Sinister Karppinen became the band's permanent drummer in this time. Their debut LP Whore of Bethlehem was released in September 2006, and they embarked on a European tour in spring 2007 with Black Witchery. A live split of this tour was released as Desecration & Sodomy in 2008. In 2020 the band released live album, Black Mass XXX. Commemorating 30 years of live performance, it was recorded at Debemur Morti Productions' Servants Of Chaos showcase on 28 September 2019. It was released 10 April 2020.

In July 2015 it was announced that longtime drummer Sinister Karppinen left the band and was replaced by VnoM.

Discography

Studio albums 
 Whore of Bethlehem (2006)
 The Light-Devouring Darkness (2009)
 The Apocalyptic Triumphator (2015)
 The Luciferian Crown (2018)
 Worship the Eternal Darkness (2021)

EPs 
 Angelcunt (Tales of Desecration) (1993)
 Angelslaying Black Fucking Metal (2004)
 Heavenly Vulva (Christ's Last Rites) (2011)
 Eternal Damnation of Christ (2017)
 All Christianity Ends (2022)

Demos/promos 
 Jesus Spawn (1991)
 Penis Perversor (1993)

Live albums 
Archgoat and Black Witchery (2008)
Black Mass XXX (2020)

Split albums 
 Messe Des Morts / Angel Cunt (1999) (with Beherit)
 Lux Satanae (Thirteen Hymns Of Finnish Devil Worship) (2015) (with Satanic Warmaster)

Members

Current members 
 Angelslayer (Rainer Puolakanaho) bass, vocals – (1989–1993, 2004–present)
 Ritual Butcherer (Kai Puolakanaho) guitars, bass – (1989–1993, 2004–present)
 Goat Aggressor (Tuukka Franck) drums – (2017–present)

Former members 
 Blood Desecrator (Tommi) drums – (1989–1993)
 Sinister Karppinen (Tuomas Karppinen) drums – (2005–2015)
 VnoM  (Ville Markkanen) drums – (2015–2017)
 Diabolus Sylvarum (Risto Suomi) keyboards – (2014–2018)

Live members 
 Leneth the Unholy Carnager drums – (2004–2005)
 Maggot Wrangler drums – (2015)

Timeline

References

External links 

Finnish black metal musical groups
Musical groups established in 1989
Musical groups disestablished in 1993
Musical groups reestablished in 2004
Blackened death metal musical groups
Finnish musical trios